The William T. Hornaday Awards were a series of awards presented by the Boy Scouts of America for service in conservation and ecology.  The program is designed to encourage learning about natural resource conservation and the environment, teach sound stewardship of the natural resources and the environment, and recognize those who are outstanding in this field.  Considered to be the highest service award a youth could earn in the Boy Scouts, it was a rare and highly prized medal, with only 1,200 medals being awarded in its more than 100 year history.  In an effort to distance itself from the controversial history of Dr. Hornaday, the Boy Scouts of America formally retired the William T. Hornaday awards in October of 2020, creating the Distinguished Conservation Service Award in its place.

Awards

The fundamental purpose of the Hornaday Awards program was to encourage learning and public awareness about natural resource conservation.  Understanding and practicing sound stewardship of natural resources and environmental protection strengthened Scouting's emphasis on respecting the outdoors.      

There were seven different Hornaday awards with an ever-increasing scale of challenge.  Through earning one of these prestigious awards, candidates joined the ranks of Scouts, Venturers, Scouters, and organizations who have gone above and beyond in committing themselves to living with a positive environmental ethic, protecting the environment, and educating others about conservation issues we face today.  Hornaday awards were administered at either the local council or national level, depending on the award.

Local Awards

Badge 

The Hornaday Badge was awarded, upon approval of the local council, to a Boy Scout, or Venturer for outstanding service to conservation and environmental improvement.  The candidate had to have been a First Class Scout, Venturer, or Sea Scout.  This award included a silver badge for wear on the uniform.  Approximately 2700 Scouts earned the Badge after it was introduced in 1914.

Gold Badge 
The Gold Badge was by nomination only and was awarded by the local council to an adult Scouter.  The nominee must have demonstrated leadership and a commitment to the education of youth on a council or district level for a period of no less than three years.  This award included a gold badge for wear on the uniform.  Approximately 600 Scouters earned the Gold Badge after it was introduced in 2000.

Unit Award 
Awarded to packs, troops, teams or crews which completed a significant conservation project with at least 60 percent of unit contributing.  The unit must have written a conservation report for the project and submitted the Unit Award application to the local council.  Since all unit types are eligible to earn this award (from Cub Scout Packs to Venturing Crews), spanning many different experience levels of youth, there were different expectations of youth leadership for each unit type.  Approximately 1000 units earned the award after it was introduced in 1951.

National Awards

Youth Medals 

These medals were awarded by the National Council for Boy Scouts, Varsity Scouts or Venturers for exceptional and distinguished service to conservation and environmental improvement.  To qualify, the Scout must have completed numerous advancement requirements, and completed at least three (for Bronze) or four (for Silver) conservation projects, each from a different project category.  Each project must have been significant in nature and have contributed in a long-lasting manner to conservation efforts, with the scale of each project being no less than that of an Eagle Scout service project.  This award included a medal and square knot insignia for wear on the uniform, and a lapel pin for civilian wear.  Approximately 300 Scouts earned youth medals after the requirements were clarified and updated in 1975.

Gold Medal 
The Gold Medal was by nomination only and was awarded to an adult Scouter.  It is for unusual and distinguished service in natural resource conservation and environmental improvement at the regional or international level.  Nominations would then be approved by the Hornaday Awards Committee and the National Conservation and Environment Task Force.  Any respected conservation organization could submit a nomination.  This award included a gold medal and square knot insignia for wear on the uniform, and a lapel pin for civilian wear.  Up to six Gold Medals were able to be awarded per year.  Approximately 50 Scouters and conservation professionals earned the Gold Medal after it was introduced in 1974.

Gold Certificate 
This award was by nomination only and was awarded to an individual, corporation, or organization.  The nominee must have made an outstanding contribution to youth conservation education and demonstrated commitment to the education of youth on a national or international level, reflecting the natural resource conservation and environmental awareness mission of the Boy Scouts of America.  Candidates could be nominated by any conservation or environmental organization.  Up to six awards were able to be granted annually.  Approximately 15 certificated were awarded to organizations after it was introduced in 1990.

History

This awards program was created to recognize those that have made significant contributions to conservation. It was begun in 1915 by Dr. William T. Hornaday, director of the New York Zoological Park and founder of the National Zoo in Washington, D.C. Dr. Hornaday was an active and outspoken champion of natural resource conservation and a leader in saving the American bison from extinction. He named the award the Permanent Wild Life Protection Fund Medal. After his death in 1937, the award was renamed in Dr. Hornaday's honor and became a Boy Scouts of America award.

In 1975, the present awards program was established with funding help from DuPont, with the Bronze and Silver Medals being created for youth, and a separate Gold Medal for adult Scouters created as well.

Since 1915, a total of 1,253 medals have been awarded as of the end of 2019.  These awards represented a substantial commitment of time and energy by individuals who have learned the meaning of a conservation and environmental ethic.  Any Boy Scout, Varsity Scout, or Venturer willing to devote the time and energy to work on a project based on sound scientific principles and guided by a conservation professional or a well-versed layperson could work to qualify for one of the Hornaday Awards.

Recipients

List of William T. Hornaday Award Youth Medal recipients

List of William T. Hornaday Award Gold Medal recipients

See also

 Advancement and recognition in the Boy Scouts of America
 Eagle Scout
 List of environmental awards

References

Advancement and recognition in the Boy Scouts of America
Awards established in 1914
Environmental awards